Time & Pressure is the debut studio album by American rock band Devour the Day, which consists of former Egypt Central members Joey Walser and Blake Allison. The album was produced by Skidd Mills and was released on May 7, 2013 through Fat Lady Music. It was reissued in January 2014. The first single "Good Man" was released to radio on March 29, 2013 and for digital downloading on April 2, 2013.

Track listing

Personnel
Blake Allison - lead vocals, drums
Joey Walser - guitars, bass, piano, synthesizers, backing vocals
Skidd Mills - producer, mixer

2013 debut albums
Devour the Day albums